Eternity was a monthly conservative Christian magazine published from 1950 to 1988. It included major contributions from such well known individuals as F. F. Bruce and others.

History and profile
In 1931, Donald Barnhouse, the minister of Tenth Presbyterian Church in Philadelphia, Pennsylvania, founded Revelation magazine. He served as editor-in-chief until his death in 1960. He renamed the magazine Eternity in 1950. From 1961 to 1986, Joseph Bayly wrote a column for Eternity entitled "Out of My Mind." In 1958 Our Hope merged with Eternity, which continued as Eternity

It announced its closure in 1988. According to worldcat.org, it was published by the Evangelical Foundation of Philadelphia. (Evangelical Foundation, later Evangelical Ministries, became what is now known as the Alliance of Confessing Evangelicals and continues to operate the ministry started by Dr. Barnhouse.) While Eternity Magazine is not fully digital, portions are being republished, both as books and as web content. The process is based on a volunteer team.

See also 
 Donald Barnhouse
 Walter Ralston Martin
 Joseph T. Bayly

References

External links
Eternity at the Alliance of Confessing Evangelicals

Christian magazines
Conservative magazines published in the United States
Defunct magazines published in the United States
Magazines established in 1931
Magazines disestablished in 1988
Magazines published in Philadelphia